Guy Reteno Elekana (born 25 September 1996) is a Gabonese professional footballer who plays as a forward for Czech club SK Líšeň.

External links
 Profile by the MSFL.cz

1996 births
Living people
SK Líšeň players
Gabonese footballers
Gabonese expatriate footballers
Expatriate footballers in the Czech Republic
Association football forwards
Czech National Football League players
21st-century Gabonese people